The Roland SH-1000, introduced in 1973, was the first compact synthesizer produced in Japan, and the first synthesizer produced by Roland. It resembles a home organ more than a commercial synth, with coloured tabs labelled with descriptions of its presets and of the "footage" of the divide-down oscillator system used in its manually editable synthesizer section. It produced electronic sounds that many professional musicians sought after whilst being easier to obtain and transport than its Western equivalents.

The synthesizer has 10 simple preset voices combined with a manually editable section which can be manually tweaked around to create new interesting sounds. No user program memory is available. Its effects include white noise generator, portamento, octave transposition, two low frequency oscillators and a random note generator.

Even with a single oscillator, it sounds like there are several thanks to the 8 sub-osc keys. The ninth is the (white or pink) noise.

Notable SH-1000 users 
 Jarvis Cocker (Pulp)
 Blondie
 The Human League
 The Band
 Fad Gadget
 Giorgio Moroder
 Imagination: "Music and Lights" (1982), bass instrument
 Jethro Tull
 Eddie Jobson (with Roxy Music)
 Jolley & Swain: Backtrackin''' (1985), bass instrument
 Tetsuya Komuro
 Omar Rodriguez Lopez
 Radio Massacre International
 Steve Roach
 Barry White: Change'' (1982), bass instrument
 Vangelis
 Maksim Dunayevsky
 Cardiacs
 Boney M.

References

External links 
 Vintage Synth Explorer's page on the SH-1000
 Music with SH-1000

SH-1000
Monophonic synthesizers
Analog synthesizers
Musical instruments invented in the 1970s